"Mono" is the debut single released by Courtney Love, as a solo artist. Released the week after its parent album, America's Sweetheart, the single was overshadowed by issues Love was undergoing in her personal life – namely her drug addiction and legal problems – and was a subsequent commercial failure. A promotional music video for the song was also created.

Background and production 
"Mono" was one of the first songs recorded during the sessions for America's Sweetheart, and was written by Love, Linda Perry, former Hole bandmate, Patty Schemel and her brother, Larry Schemel. The song was recorded at Studio Miraval, a chateau in the south of France, in 2003.

The alternate version of "Mono" – featured on the maxi single release – contains a sample of dialogue from the 1963 movie Cleopatra as spoken by actors Elizabeth Taylor and Richard Burton.

Music video 
Directed by Chris Milk, the promotional music video for "Mono" received some airplay on channels such as Fuse, VH1, Kerrang! and MTV2, however, did not reach the level of popularity achieved by her previous releases with Hole. The music video featured a "sleeping beauty" theme.

Track listings and formats
CAN / EU CD Single / EU 7" Vinyl
"Mono"  – 3:39
"Fly"  – 2:56

EU Maxi / UK CD Single
"Mono"  – 3:39
"Fly"  – 2:56
"Mono" (Alternate Version) – 3:41
"Mono" (Video) – 3:39

Charts and sales

References 

2004 singles
Music videos directed by Chris Milk
Songs written by Linda Perry
Courtney Love songs
Songs written by Courtney Love
2004 songs
Virgin Records singles
Song recordings produced by Josh Abraham